Eurico Alessandro Degaspari (born September 23, 1984 in Piracicaba), known as Eurico, is a Brazilian footballer who plays as left back for Toledo.

Career statistics

References

External links

1984 births
Living people
Brazilian footballers
Association football defenders
Ituano FC players
People from Piracicaba
Footballers from São Paulo (state)